E 312 is a European B class road in the Netherlands, connecting the cities of Flushing (Vlissingen) and Eindhoven.

During its entire course, it follows highway 58 (A58) and is a motorway.

Road connections:
N98 (Highway 57 - Middelburg)
N99 (Highway 4 - Bergen op Zoom)
E19 (Highway 16 - Princenhage)
E311 (Highway 27 - Ginneken en Bavel)
N93 (Highway 65 - Tilburg)
E25 (Highway 2 - Best)
N94 (Highway 50 - Eindhoven)

Before the renumbering of the E-roads in the 1980s, the section between Breda and Eindhoven was known as E 38, while the section heading to Flushing was then part of National Road 97.

References

External links 
 UN Economic Commission for Europe: Overall Map of E-road Network (2007)

International E-road network
E312
Motorways in North Brabant
Motorways in Zeeland
Transport in Bergen op Zoom
Transport in Breda
Transport in Eindhoven
Transport in Middelburg, Zeeland
Transport in Tilburg
Transport in Vlissingen